Steel Warriors is a 1998 compilation album by the heavy metal band Manowar. It includes only songs from the albums Into Glory Ride and Hail to England.

Track listing 

 "Secret of Steel"
 "Black Arrows"
 "Each Dawn I Die"
 "Hatred"
 "Warlord"
 "Gloves of Metal"
 "Bridge of Death"
 "Hail to England"
 "Kill With Power"
 "March for Revenge (By the Soldiers of Death)"
 "Gates of Valhalla"
 "Army of the Immortals"

1998 compilation albums
Manowar albums